The University of Lapland (Finnish: Lapin yliopisto) is a public research university located in the city of Rovaniemi, Finland which was established in 1979. The campus houses 4650 undergraduate and graduate students, and 730 staff members. It is the northernmost university in the European Union.

The university is funded by the Finnish Government.

Studies 
The university has four faculties:
 Faculty of Art and Design
 Faculty of Education
 Faculty of Law
 Faculty of Social Sciences
Studies can be conducted on a bachelor's, master's, and doctorate level in Finnish, with opportunity for study in English at the master's and doctorate level. There are also study opportunities for Sámi culture and language.

Research 
The University of Lapland focuses its research on changes in the northern climate and other forms of arctic research such as responsible tourism and sustainability.  

The university's faculty of law also studies the rights and issues of the Finnish minority group Sámi. 

The strategic choices deal with
 global Arctic responsibility
 sustainable tourism
 future services and reachability

In addition to faculties, there is the Arctic Centre that conducts multidisciplinary research in changes in the Arctic region, and communicates Arctic issues via Arktikum Science Centre and science communications.

Rectors
Esko Riepula 1979–2006
Mauri Ylä-Kotola 2006–2019
Antti Syväjärvi 2019–

Notable people
Liisa Rantalaiho (b. 1933), sociologist
Pigga Keskitalo (b. 1972), Sámi politician and academic
Katri Kulmuni (b. 1987), politician, former Centre Party leader and Minister of Finance

See also
 List of universities in Finland

References

External links

 
Lapland
Education in Lapland (Finland)
Rovaniemi
Educational institutions established in 1979
Buildings and structures in Lapland (Finland)
1979 establishments in Finland